The Treasure Knights and the Secret of Melusina is a 2012 German-Luxembourgian children's film. Directed by Laura Schroeder. The film follows an Enid Blyton-like story plot.

Content 
Jeff and his friends are searching for the treasure of Melusina and falling into adventure.

Cast 
 Anton Glas - Jeff Kutter
 Thierry Koob - Leo
 Lana Welter - Julia
 Tun Schon - Killer
 Alexandra Neldel - Melanie
 Clemens Schick - Duc de Barry
 Elisabeth Brück - Killers Mutter

Background 
The film  was made by Lucil Film, NEOS Film, Bavaria Film Partners, Screenvest and Perathon Medien. Its premiere was on 4 July 2012 in Luxembourg and the German premiere in Munich on 30 August 2012. It was filmed in Luxembourg (Notre-Dame Cathedral) and Germany (Saarland and Munich).

References

External links 
 
 Official Luxembourgian Website
 Official German Website
 "Dies sind die Hauptdarsteller des Films" News arcicle to the mainactors of wort.lu

2012 films
Luxembourgian drama films
2010s German-language films
German children's films